The C&C 34/36 is a Canadian sailboat series, designed by Robert W. Ball and first built in 1989. Ball was the chief designer for C&C Yachts between 1969 and 1991.

Production
The boat was built by C&C Yachts in Canada, but it is now out of production. When it was originally introduced it was called the C&C 34, but it replaced the 1977-vintage C&C 34 in production.

Design
The C&C 34/36 series are all recreational keelboats, built predominantly of fiberglass, with wood trim. They all have masthead sloop rigs, reverse transoms and internally-mounted spade-type rudders. The line was introduced in 1989.

The series includes the "+" version, which is a club racer-cruiser, the "R" version, which is a deep keel racing model and a later "XL" model, which combined the performance of the "R" with a cruising interior. There was also the option of a wing keel.

All models have forward and aft cabins, with additional berths in the middle of the main cabin. The head is located just aft of the bow cabin.

The rigging varies from model to model. The mainsheet traveller may be located on the transom, the coach house roof or at the steering pedestal. The jib winches may be located on the cockpit coaming or on the coach house roof. Mast supports include rod-type stays and either a single backstay or running backstays. Some versions have two spreaders, while others have three.

Variants
C&C 34/36
C&C 34+DK
C&C 34+R
It is built from a fibreglass and Kevlar sandwich, with a balsawood-cored hull and deck. This model has a galley with a two-burner propane stove, dual sinks with hot and cold pressurized water and an icebox. A navigation station is located opposite the galley. The interior features varnished teak and a holly cabin sole, while the exterior teak is oiled. Ventilation includes four vented hatches, five opening ports and a forward hatch.
C&C 34+WK
The boat has a PHRF racing average handicap of 144 with a high of 152 and low of 144.
C&C 34XL
Model which combines the performance of the "R", with a cruising interior.
C&C 34-2
C&C 34-2 WK

Operational history
In a review of the 34+, Michael McGoldrick wrote, "The C&C 34+ has a brash look which suggests that it was meant to go very fast. For its size, it is a relatively light boat, and it's hard to miss the aggressive looking elliptical-shaped keel. In fact, C&C literature on this boat implies that it was designed as an out-and-out racer, which seems to be confirmed by the fact that it was available as a stripped-down racer (the so-called "R" version of this boat). The 34+ version is a racing/cruising model, but most people would still consider it to be heavily slanted towards racing. The interior of this version comes with athwartship aft cabin, an aft head, a contoured dinette/settee, and a navigation station. There is also a "XL" version of this boat which consists of the racing model with a few amenities thrown in below to make the interior a little more livable."

See also
List of sailing boat types

Similar sailboats
Beneteau 331
Beneteau First Class 10
C&C 35
C&C 36R
Cal 35
Cal 35 Cruise
Catalina 34
Coast 34
Columbia 34
Columbia 34 Mark II
Crown 34
CS 34
Express 34
Express 35
Freedom 35
Goderich 35
Hughes 36
Hughes-Columbia 36
Hunter 34
Hunter 35 Legend
Hunter 35.5 Legend
Hunter 356
Island Packet 35
Landfall 35
Mirage 35
Niagara 35
Pilot 35
San Juan 34
Sea Sprite 34
Southern Cross 35
Sun Odyssey 349
Tartan 34 C
Tartan 34-2
Viking 34

References

Keelboats
1980s sailboat type designs
Sailing yachts
Sailboat type designs by Robert W. Ball
Sailboat types built by C&C Yachts